Hapoel Haifa Football Club is an Israeli football club located in Haifa. During the 2016-17 campaign they will be competing in the following competitions:Israeli Premier League, State Cup, Toto Cup Ligat Al.

Club

Kits

 Provider: Diadora
 Main Sponsor: Sitrus
 Secondary Sponsor:  Moked Hat'ama

First team

Transfers

Summer

In:

Out:

Winter

In:

Out:

Pre-season and friendlies

Competitions

Overview

Ligat Ha'Al

Results summary

Results by matchday

Regular season

Regular season table

Results overview

Play-off

Relegation round table

Results overview

State Cup

Round of 32

Round of 16

Quarter final

Toto Cup

Group stage

Quarter final

Semi-final

Statistics

Appearances and goals

|-
|colspan="12"|Players away from Hapoel Haifa on loan:
|-

|-

|-
|colspan="12"|Players who appeared for Hapoel Haifa  that left during the season:
|-

|}

Goalscorers

Last updated: 13 May 2017

References

Hapoel Haifa F.C. seasons
Hapoel Haifa